Yousef D. Rabhi (born June 9, 1988) is a former member of the Michigan House of Representatives who also served as the Democratic Floor Leader. He represented Michigan's 53rd House District, encompassing the majority of Ann Arbor, from 2017 to 2023. He replaced Jeff Irwin, who was term limited. He is a member of the Democratic Party.

Early life and education
Rabhi was born in Ypsilanti and raised on the North Side of Ann Arbor. His father is a mechanical engineer and his mother a longstanding community activist. His mother's involvement in the Ann Arbor Democratic Party, as well as his grandfather's history of labor organizing in Detroit inspired Rabhi to pursue a career in public service.  Rabhi is of Algerian descent on his paternal side.

Rabhi attended Blossom Home Preschool where he was exposed early to environmental protection through the Adopt-A-Stream program. After graduating from Huron High School in 2006, Rabhi attended the University of Michigan and graduated with a Bachelor of Science in Environmental Science with a specialization in urban planning and ecosystems management.

Electoral history

Washtenaw County Board of Commissioners (2010–2016, 2023-present)

2010 Washtenaw County Board of Commissioners 
	In 2010, while still attending the University of Michigan, Rabhi was elected to the Washtenaw County Board of Commissioners, earning over 75% of the vote to defeat Republican candidate Joe Baublis.

He won his primary election by two votes.

The commissioners elected Rabhi to serve as chair of the Board's Working Sessions.

2012 Washtenaw County Board of Commissioners 
Following the redistricting completed in 2011, Washtenaw's districts shrunk from eleven to nine. Unopposed in the Democratic primary, Rabhi was elected as commissioner for District 8, which comprised most of the same area as the former District 11. Rabhi won 77.75% of the vote, succeeding again over Republic candidate Joe Baublis.  His fellow commissioners elected Rabhi to serve as chair of the Board.

2014 Washtenaw County Board of Commissioners 
After winning 82.22% of the vote, Rabhi was reelected in 2014 to serve as District 8's county commissioner; the Board elected him to serve as vice chair.

Michigan House of Representatives (2016–2022)

Campaign 
Rabhi announced his candidacy for Representative for Michigan's 53rd District in September 2015. The seat was left vacant by Democrat Jeff Irwin who was term limited. Irwin - alongside a majority of local elected officials like Ann Arbor Mayor Chris Taylor and the entire Ann Arbor City Council – endorsed Rabhi's candidacy. Rabhi ran on a platform that sought to secure "a healthier Environment, a resilient Economy, a strong Public Education system, and Equity for all".

Election 
In the August 2016 Democratic primary, Rabhi won over 85% of the vote over candidate Steven Kwasny. In the November general, Rabhi secured 80.26% over the vote, defeating Republican candidate Samuel Bissell and Green Party candidate Joseph Stevens.

Washtenaw Board of County Commissioners 
Through his six year tenure as a county commissioner, Rabhi served as chair of the Board's Working Sessions, chair, and vice chair. During his time as  chair, Washtenaw County balanced a four-year budget for the first time in its history. Under Rabhi's leadership, the Board was also able to secure stable 10-year labor agreements and earn the County's first AAA Bond rating.

Rabhi also spearheaded many community development programs, including the creation of the first Municipal ID program in the Midwest and the establishment of the Washtenaw Dental Clinic, which serves uninsured and Medicaid eligible patients.

As a county commissioner, Rabhi served on many different boards such as committees and commissions covering public safety, public works, solid waste management, transportation, regional cooperation, human service funding, land preservation and food policy.

Michigan House of Representatives
Rabhi was sworn into the 99th Michigan Legislature in January 2017. He serves on the House Committee on Appropriations. He serves on the House Appropriations Subcommittees on Higher Education, Community Colleges, and Department of Environmental Quality. He also serves as the minority vice chair on the Appropriations Subcommittee on the Department of Environmental Quality. During his second term, he is serving on the Committee on Government Operations, the House Fiscal Agency Governing Committee, and the Legislative Council.

Rabhi has campaigned for the shutdown of Enbridge Line 5 (a petroleum pipeline that crosses the Straits of Mackinac) asserting the 65-year-old pipeline is likely to spill.

He opposed revisions made to the Michigan Public School Employees Retirement System in 2017 which shifted state educators' pensions into 401(k) plans.

Rabhi has also backed legislation supporting immigration rights and legal marijuana, and no-fault auto insurance.

Rabhi was elected Democratic Floor Leader for the 100th session of the Michigan Legislature.

References

External links
 Campaign website
 https://housedems.com/rabhi

Democratic Party members of the Michigan House of Representatives
Living people
American people of Algerian descent
21st-century American politicians
1988 births
University of Michigan alumni
Politicians from Ypsilanti, Michigan